Xoşçobanlı (also, Khoshchobanly and Khoshchobanny) is a village and municipality in the Masally District of Azerbaijan.  It has a population of 1,285.

References 

Populated places in Masally District